Bristol West is a borough constituency represented in the House of Commons of the Parliament of the United Kingdom since 2015 by Thangam Debbonaire of the Labour Party. It mostly covers the central and western parts of Bristol.

Constituency profile
More urban since boundary changes in 2010, the seat retains a high proportion of the city's most garden-rich, grandest houses and landscaped civic parks in affluent suburbs such as Clifton and Redland. Many of the townhouses in Bristol were subdivided in the latter half of the 20th century, during which time the size of the University of Bristol increased (the city's largest single independent employer which is chiefly in the seat). The seat also includes poorer areas such as Lawrence Hill and Easton.

Boundaries

1885–1918: The Municipal Borough of Bristol wards: Clifton, St Augustine's, St Michael's, and Westbury, and the local government district of Horfield.

1918–1950:  The County Borough of Bristol wards: Clifton North, Clifton South, Horfield, Redland, St Michael, and Westbury-on-Trym.

1950–1955: The County Borough of Bristol wards: Bishopston, Clifton, Redland, St Augustine, St James, and St Michael.

1955–1974:  The County Borough of Bristol wards: Bishopston, Cabot, Clifton, Durdham, and Redland.

1974–1983:  as above plus District

1983–1997:  The City of Bristol wards of Ashley, Bishopston, Cabot, Clifton, Cotham, Henleaze, Redland, and Stoke Bishop.

1997–2010:  as above plus Westbury-on-Trym.

2010–present: as above less Westbury-on-Trym, Stoke Bishop and Henleaze, plus Clifton East, Easton, and Lawrence Hill

The above shows that the changes implemented for the 2010 general election boundaries were relatively great, recommended by a periodic impartial Boundary Commission review.  Easton and Lawrence Hill wards were transferred from Bristol East, while Henleaze, Stoke Bishop and Westbury-on-Trym wards were lost to Bristol North West. During the review, a proposal to rename the constituency as "Bristol Central" was rejected.

History
Held by Conservatives continuously for 112 years, it was at various points represented by Conservative cabinet ministers Michael Hicks-Beach, Oliver Stanley, Walter Monckton and William Waldegrave. As part of a national Labour Party landslide, exceeding that of 1945, the 1997 gain by Valerie Davey was from a third-placed starting point for the party's candidate in 1992.  
At the 2005 election the seat was Liberal Democrat target number 18, and Conservative target number 50; it had been frequently described in the media as a "three-way marginal", and all parties fought hard for the constituency. The seat was taken by Liberal Democrat Stephen Williams with a large majority, thought to have been aided by the large student electorate, hostile to Labour's top-up fees policy. This Liberal Democrat success was similar to those in other seats with a large student population, such as Cambridge, Manchester Withington, Leeds North West and Cardiff Central. In the 2010 election, Stephen Williams held the seat with an increased majority. In the 2015 general election, the Lib Dem vote fell by 29.2%; Williams came a distant third behind the winning Labour candidate Thangam Debbonaire and more than 5,000 votes behind the Green Party candidate, who achieved the greatest increase in the Green vote (+23%) in any seat that election.  In 2017 Bristol West had the biggest swing to Labour in the country. The 52.1% majority was also the largest in the seat since 1931.

In the 2016 referendum to leave the European Union, the constituency voted remain by 79.3%. This was the second highest support for remain for a constituency.

As a result of the formation of a Brexit 'Unite to Remain' pact between the Liberal Democrats, the Green Party and Plaid Cymru prior to the 2019 snap election, the Liberal Democrats agreed to withdraw from the Bristol West election in favour of the Green Party. The result was a double in the Green vote and a reduction in the Labour majority by almost 10,000, but with a majority of over 28,000 for the Labour Party, the seat remains very safe.

In the 2021 Bristol City Council election, 16 of the 19 city councillors elected in Bristol West were from the Green Party.

Members of Parliament

Elections

Elections in the 2010s

(Note that the vote-share changes for 2010 are from the notional results on the new boundaries, not the actual 2005 results)

Elections in the 2000s

Elections in the 1990s

Elections in the 1980s

Elections in the 1970s

Elections in the 1960s

Elections in the 1950s

Elections in the 1940s

Elections in the 1930s

Elections in the 1920s

Elections in the 1910s

Election results 1885–1918

Elections in the 1880s

Hicks Beach was appointed Chief Secretary to the Lord Lieutenant of Ireland, requiring a by-election.

Hicks Beach was appointed President of the Board of Trade, requiring a by-election.

Elections in the 1890s

Elections in the 1900s

Elections in the 1910s

General Election 1914–15:

Another General Election was required to take place before the end of 1915. The political parties had been making preparations for an election to take place and by the July 1914, the following candidates had been selected;
Unionist: George Gibbs
Liberal:

See also
List of parliamentary constituencies in Avon

References

West
Constituencies of the Parliament of the United Kingdom established in 1885